Frog Lake is a 10-acre lake in Wasco County, Oregon, located south of Mount Hood off U.S. Route 26 between Government Camp and Maupin. The lake is primarily used for recreational purposes, such as camping, boating, fishing, and swimming.

The lake is the source of Frog Creek, a tributary of Clear Creek, a tributary of the White River.

See also
 Frog Lake (Oregon), for other lakes with the name
 List of lakes in Oregon

References

Lakes of Oregon
Lakes of Wasco County, Oregon
Protected areas of Wasco County, Oregon
Mount Hood National Forest